The 2022 United States state legislative elections were held on November 8, 2022, for 88 state legislative chambers in 46 states. Across the fifty states, approximately 56 percent of all upper house seats and 92 percent of all lower house seats were up for election. Additionally, six territorial chambers were up in four territories and the District of Columbia. These midterm elections coincided with other state and local elections, including gubernatorial elections in multiple states.

Prior to the elections, Democrats held 14 trifectas (control of the governor's office and legislative chambers), Republicans held 23 trifectas, and 13 states held a divided government. These were the first elections affected by the 2020 redistricting cycle, which reapportioned state legislatures based on data from the 2020 United States census.

This is the first midterm election since 1934 in which the party of the incumbent president did not lose any state legislative chambers to the opposition.

The Democrats flipped the Minnesota Senate, Michigan Senate for the first time since 1985,  Michigan House of Representatives, and Pennsylvania House of Representatives from Republican control, and established a coalition government in the Alaska Senate.

Summary table

Regularly-scheduled elections were held in 88 of the 99 state legislative chambers in the United States; nationwide, regularly-scheduled elections were held for 6,064 of the 7,383 legislative seats. Most legislative chambers held elections for all seats, but some legislative chambers that use staggered elections held elections for only a portion of the total seats in the chamber. The chambers that were not up for election either hold regularly-scheduled elections in odd-numbered years, or have four-year terms and hold all regularly-scheduled elections in presidential election years.

Note that this table only covers regularly-scheduled elections; additional special elections took place concurrently with these regularly-scheduled elections.

Election predictions 
Several sites and individuals publish predictions of competitive chambers. These predictions look at factors such as the strength of the party, the strength of the candidates, and the partisan leanings of the state (reflected in part by the state's Cook Partisan Voting Index rating). The predictions assign ratings to each chambers, with the rating indicating the predicted advantage that a party has in winning that election.

Most election predictors use:
 "Tossup": No advantage
 "Tilt": Advantage that is not quite as strong as "lean"
 "Lean": Slight advantage
 "Likely": Significant, but surmountable, advantage 
 "Safe" or "Solid": Near-certain chance of victory

State summaries

Alabama

Alaska

Arizona

Arkansas

California

Colorado

Connecticut

Delaware

Florida

Georgia

Hawaii

Idaho

Illinois

Indiana

Iowa

Kansas

Kentucky

Maine

Maryland

Massachusetts

Michigan

Minnesota

Missouri

Montana

Nebraska

Nevada

New Hampshire

New Mexico

New York

North Carolina

North Dakota

Ohio

Oklahoma

Oregon

Pennsylvania

Rhode Island

South Carolina

South Dakota

Tennessee

Texas

Utah

Vermont

Washington

West Virginia

Wisconsin

Wyoming

Territorial and federal district summaries

American Samoa
All of the seats of the American Samoa House of Representatives were up for election. Members of the House of Representatives serve two-year terms. Gubernatorial and legislative elections are conducted on a nonpartisan basis in American Samoa.

Guam

All of the seats of the unicameral Legislature of Guam were up for election. All members of the legislature serve a two-year term. Democrats retained control of the legislature.

Northern Mariana Islands
A portion of the seats of the Northern Mariana Islands Senate, and all of the seats of the Northern Mariana Islands House of Representatives, were up for election. Members of the senate serve either four-year terms, while members of the house serve two-year terms. A coalition of Independents and Democrats replaced the Republican-controlled Senate and Democratic-controlled House.

U.S. Virgin Islands
All of the seats of the unicameral Legislature of the Virgin Islands were up for election. All members of the legislature serve a two-year term. Democrats retained control of the legislature.

Washington, D.C.

The Council of the District of Columbia serves as the legislative branch of the federal district of Washington, D.C. Half of the council seats are up for election in 2022. Council members serve four-year terms. Democrats retained supermajority control of the council.

Special elections 
Various states held special elections for legislative districts throughout the year.

Alabama

Arkansas

California

Connecticut

Delaware

Florida

Georgia

Kansas

Kentucky

Louisiana

Maine

Massachusetts

Michigan

Mississippi

Montana

Nebraska

New Jersey

New York

Oregon

Pennsylvania

South Carolina

Texas

Virginia

Washington

Notes

References 

 
State legislature elections in the United States by year